Frommer is a surname. Notable people with the surname include:

Arthur Frommer (born 1929), American travel writer
Dario Frommer (born 1963), American politician
Jeremy Frommer, American financier
Nico Frommer (born 1978), German footballer
Paul Frommer (born 1944), American linguist
Rudolf Frommer (1868–1936), Hungarian weapon designer